IEEE Transactions on Circuits and Systems I: Regular Papers (sometimes abbreviated IEEE TCAS-I) is a monthly peer-reviewed scientific journal covering the theory, analysis, design, and practical implementations of electrical and electronic circuits, and the application of circuit techniques to systems and to signal processing. It is published by the IEEE Circuits and Systems Society. The journal was established in 1952 and the editor-in-chief is Weisheng Zhao (Beihang University).

According to the Journal Citation Reports, the 2020 impact factor of the journal is 3.605.

Title history
Adapted from IEEE Xplore.

1992–2003: IEEE Transactions on Circuits and Systems I: Fundamental Theory and Applications
1974–1991: IEEE Transactions on Circuits and Systems
1963–1973: IEEE Transactions on Circuit Theory
1954–1962: IRE Transactions on Circuit Theory
1952–1954: Transactions of the IRE Professional Group on Circuit Theory

Editors-in-chief
The following people are or have been editor-in-chief:

References

External links

Transactions on Circuits and Systems I: Regular Papers
Publications established in 1952
English-language journals